Tan Sri Datuk Seri Ahmad Phesal bin Talib (born 1955) was a Malaysian public servant who served as 10th Mayor of Kuala Lumpur.

Honours 
  :
  Member of the Order of the Defender of the Realm (AMN) (1998)
 Commander of the Order of Meritorious Service (PJN) – Datuk (2010)
 Commander of the Order of Loyalty to the Crown of Malaysia (PSM) – Tan Sri (2015)
  :
 Officer of the Order of the Defender of State (DSPN) – Dato' (2003)
  :
 Grand Commander of the Order of the Territorial Crown (SMW) – Datuk Seri (2013)

References 

Mayors of Kuala Lumpur
Members of the Order of the Defender of the Realm
Commanders of the Order of Meritorious Service
Commanders of the Order of Loyalty to the Crown of Malaysia
1955 births
Living people